Galactolysis refers to the catabolism of galactose.

In the liver, galactose is converted through the Leloir pathway to glucose 6-phosphate in the following reactions:

        galacto-                uridyl                phosphogluco-
         kinase               transferase                mutase
    gal --------> gal 1 P ------------------> glc 1 P -----------> glc 6 P
                             ^           \
                            /             v
                         UDP-glc       UDP-gal
                            ^             /
                             \___/
                               epimerase

Metabolic disorders
There are 3 types of galactosemia or galactose deficiencies:

Glycolysis